Cryptanthus arelii is a plant species in the genus Cryptanthus. This species is endemic to Brazil.

References

arelii
Flora of Brazil